Archaeosine (G*) is a modified nucleoside found in the dihydrouracil loop at position 15 of tRNAs found in Archaea, and is thought to be important for the heat resistance of thermophilic archaea such as Thermococcus kodakarensis.

See also 
 Queuine

References 

Nucleosides
Hydroxymethyl compounds